Nationality words link to articles with information on the nation's poetry or literature (for instance, Irish or France).

Events

Works published

Births
Death years link to the corresponding "[year] in poetry" article. There are conflicting or unreliable sources for the birth years of many people born in this period; where sources conflict, the poet is listed again and the conflict is noted:

910:
 Fujiwara no Asatada (died 966), one of the Thirty-six Poetry Immortals of Japan
 Minamoto no Saneakira (died 970), another of the Thirty-six Poetry Immortals

911:
 Minamoto no Shitagō 源順 (died 983), Japanese waka poet, scholar and nobleman; one of the Five Men of the Pear Chamber and Thirty-six Poetry Immortals of Japan; author of the  poetry collection; some scholars claim that he also wrote the Taketori Monogatari; original compiler of the Wamyō Ruijushō, the first extant Japanese dictionary organized into semantic headings

912:
 Nakatsukasa (died 991), one of the Thirty-six Poetry Immortals of Japan and the daughter of Lady Ise

915:
 Al-Mutanabbi (died 965), Arabic poet
 Abu-Shakur Balkhi (died unknown), Persian poet

Deaths
Birth years link to the corresponding "[year] in poetry" article:

910:
 Sosei (born 816), one of the Thirty-six Poetry Immortals of Japan
 Wei Zhuang (born 836), Chinese poet

919:
 Clement of Ohrid (born 840), Bulgarian writer and founder of the Ohrid Literary School

See also

 Poetry
 10th century in poetry
 10th century in literature
 List of years in poetry

Other events:
 Other events of the 12th century
 Other events of the 13th century

10th century:
 10th century in poetry
 10th century in literature

Notes

10th-century poetry
Poetry